Jim Courier defeated Andre Agassi in the final, 3–6, 6–4, 2–6, 6–1, 6–4 to win the men's singles tennis title at the 1991 French Open.

Andres Gomez was the defending champion, but did not compete this year.

Boris Becker was attempting to complete the career Grand Slam, but lost to Agassi in the semifinals.

Seeds
The seeded players are listed below. Jim Courier is the champion; others show the round in which they were eliminated.

  Stefan Edberg (quarterfinals)
  Boris Becker (semifinals)
  Ivan Lendl (withdrew due to wrist injury)
  Andre Agassi (finals)
  Sergi Bruguera (second round)
  Pete Sampras (second round)
  Guy Forget (fourth round)
  Goran Ivanišević (second round)
  Jim Courier (champion)
  Michael Chang (quarterfinals)
  Emilio Sánchez (second round)
  Michael Stich (semifinals)
  Jonas Svensson (withdrew due to injury)
  Karel Nováček (first round)
  John McEnroe (first round)
  Brad Gilbert (first round)

Draw

Finals

Top half

Section 1

Section 2

Section 3

Section 4

Bottom half

Section 5

Section 6

Section 7

Section 8

External links
 Association of Tennis Professionals (ATP) – 1991 French Open Men's Singles draw
1991 French Open – Men's draws and results at the International Tennis Federation

Men's Singles
French Open by year – Men's singles
1991 ATP Tour